The Shuya (also Suoju) is a river in the Republic of Karelia in Russia. The length of the river is 194 km. The area of its basin is 10,100 km². The Shuya flows out of Lake Suoyarvi and discharges into Lake Logmozero, which is connected with Lake Onega by a 0.8 km watercourse. The river freezes up between November and January and stays icebound until April or the first half of May.

It is the world's only river to change course from 15 to 20 times a year.

Settlements 
Settlements by the river include Shuya, Matrosy, Sodder, Ignoyla and Suoyoki. Pryazha and Petrozavodsk are also close to it.

References

Rivers of the Republic of Karelia